Hearth: Memorial to the Enslaved is a memorial on the campus of the College of William & Mary in Williamsburg, Virginia. It was dedicated in 2022 to those enslaved by the university over a period of 172 years.

Background

The College of William and Mary was founded in 1693, and benefited from slave labor in various capacities. Historians discovered the names of over 100 people owned by college employees, students, and the college itself; the actual number of slaves was likely much higher.

The three primary buildings on the college's Ancient Campus (also called "Historic Campus")–the Brafferton, Wren Building, and President's House–were constructed and maintained in part using using enslaved labor. Slaves both made the bricks used in construction of the Wren Building and erected the building itself.

Planning
In 2009, the college began the Lemon Project, an effort to research how enslaved people lived and worked at the college throughout its history. In 2014, the Lemon Project's director, Jody Allen, along with instructor Ed Pease, asked students to submit proposals for a possible memorial to the enslaved.

On August 28, 2018, the college launched an international competition to solicit ideas for the memorial. Over 80 entries were received.

On April 26, 2019, school president Katherine Rowe announced the winning design. Titled "Hearth" and designed by William Sendor, William & Mary alumnus who graduated in 2011, the memorial would be made of brick and serve as a gathering spot. Some bricks would be inscribed with names of enslaved people.

Construction and dedication

To build the concept into a physical memorial, the college tapped Richmond-based architects Baskervill and construction firm Kjellstrom & Lee. Groundbreaking took place in May 2021.

It cost $2.9 million to build; the money came from private donations along with contributions from the university's board of visitors.

The dedication took place on May 7, 2022. More than 800 people attended.

Future plans
There will eventually be a vessel installed that will hold a fire, which will be lit on special occasions.

References

Monuments and memorials to victims of slavery in the United States
College of William & Mary